Raja Jon Vurputoor Chari is an American test pilot and NASA astronaut. He is a graduate of the United States Air Force Academy, Massachusetts Institute of Technology, and U.S. Naval Test Pilot School, and has over 2,000 flying hours. He is a brigadier general in the United States Air Force.

Early life and education
Chari was born in Milwaukee, Wisconsin, to Peggy Egbert and Sreenivas V. Chari from India. 
He was raised in Cedar Falls, Iowa, and attended Columbus High School, graduating in 1995. He attended the United States Air Force Academy in Colorado Springs, Colorado, and graduated in 1999 with a Bachelor of Science in astronautical engineering and engineering science, with a minor in mathematics. Following his graduation, Chari attended the Massachusetts Institute of Technology in Cambridge as a Draper Fellow, earning a Master of Science in aeronautical and astronautical engineering in 2001.

Air Force career
Following completion of his graduate studies, Chari attended Undergraduate Pilot Training at Vance Air Force Base, Oklahoma. He attended F-15E Strike Eagle training at Seymour Johnson Air Force Base, North Carolina and was subsequently stationed at Elmendorf AFB, Alaska and RAF Lakenheath, England, deploying in support of the Iraq War. In 2007, Chari attended the U.S. Naval Test Pilot School at Patuxent River, Maryland as an Air Force Exchange Officer, and was a developmental test pilot at Eglin AFB, Florida, where he served as the project pilot for the APG-63 and APG-82 Active Electronically Scanned Array radar programs. Chari also attended the U.S. Army Command and General Staff College in Fort Leavenworth, Kansas, and served as a CENTCOM time sensitive targeting officer. At the time of his selection as an Astronaut in June 2017, Chari was serving as the commanding officer of the 461st Flight Test Squadron at Edwards AFB, California.

In January 2023, Chari was nominated for promotion to brigadier general.

NASA career
In June 2017, Chari was selected for NASA Astronaut Group 22, and reported for duty in August to begin two years of training as an astronaut.

In December 2020, Chari was selected to be a part of the Artemis Team, a group of astronauts "to help pave the way for the next lunar missions including sending the first woman and next man to walk on the lunar surface in 2024." The same month, he became the first astronaut from Group 22 to be selected for a space mission, SpaceX Crew-3, which he commanded. Chari is the first NASA rookie to command a spaceflight since Joe Engle, who commanded the STS-2 mission in 1981.

On March 23, 2022, Chari and ESA astronaut Matthias Maurer exited the Quest Joint Airlock on the ISS to perform an EVA. However, Maurer's helmet camera became loose, delaying the start of the activities by an hour. Chari ultimately secured it using wire, and the spacewalk was completed successfully.

Personal life
Chari is married to Holly Schaffter Chari, also a Cedar Falls native, and the couple has three children.

Awards and honors
During his Air Force career, Chari was awarded the Defense Meritorious Service Medal, the Meritorious Service Medal, the Aerial Achievement Medal, the Air Force Commendation Medal, the Air Force Achievement Medal, the Iraq Campaign Medal, the Korean Defense Service Medal, and the Nuclear Deterrence Operations Service Medal. Chari is an Eagle Scout, and was a distinguished graduate from the U.S. Air Force Academy and Undergraduate Pilot Training.

References

11. Srivastava, Namrata (May 30, 2021). "NASA’s space mission Commander has Telangana roots" . Telangana Today. Retrieved January 15, 2022.

1977 births
Living people
American astronauts
American people of Indian descent
Military personnel from Milwaukee
People from Cedar Falls, Iowa
United States Air Force Academy alumni
United States Air Force colonels
Massachusetts Institute of Technology alumni
Wikipedia articles incorporating text from NASA
American test pilots
American aviators of Asian descent
SpaceX astronauts
Spacewalkers